Ischnoceros sapporensis is a parasitoid wasp from ichneumonid family that parasitizes long-horned beetles of these species: Aromia moschata,  Rhagium mordax, Rhagium bifasciatum, Saperda carcharias,.

References

Xoridinae
Taxa named by Johann Ludwig Christian Gravenhorst
Insects described in 1829